Svastra sabinensis is a species of long-horned bee in the family Apidae. It is found in Central America and North America.

Subspecies
These three subspecies belong to the species Svastra sabinensis:
 Svastra sabinensis laterufa Cockerell, 1934
 Svastra sabinensis nubila (LaBerge, 1956)
 Svastra sabinensis sabinensis (Cockerell, 1924)

References

Further reading

 
 

Apinae
Insects described in 1924